Luke Stricklin (born December 21, 1982) is an American country music singer and songwriter. He is from Arkadelphia, Arkansas. He has a single "American by God's Amazing Grace," which he originally wrote and recorded in Baghdad, Iraq with J.R. Schultz. It tells of their experiences fighting in the Iraq War. Stricklin signed with Pacific-Time Records. Luke is a 2001 graduate from Van Buren High School, and attended Arkadelphia Public Schools until his senior year, when his mother, Sheila Harrington and step-father, Patrick Harrington, moved to Van Buren. Luke currently resides in Rudy, Arkansas with his wife, Tommie Sue Stricklin (born March 10, 1990) and daughter.

Discography

Albums

Singles

Music videos

References

1982 births
Living people
People from Van Buren, Arkansas
United States Army soldiers
United States Army personnel of the Iraq War
American country singer-songwriters
People from Arkadelphia, Arkansas
Singer-songwriters from Arkansas
21st-century American singers
Country musicians from Arkansas